The Bittersweets are an alternative country duo from Nashville, Tennessee, founded by singer-songwriter Chris Meyers (guitar, keyboards, vocals) and Hannah Prater (vocals, guitar) in 2005. They frequently tour venues and festivals in the Southern United States.

History
Meyers and Prater met in San Francisco, California after Meyers had moved there after attending Kenyon College in Ohio. Before they met, Hannah Prater had toured as a jazz vocalist in Europe. Prater, a California native, is the child of two music teachers. Meyers, born in Massachusetts, began playing guitar in his teens and toured locally while still in college.

Before releasing their first full length album, The Bittersweets opened for Train at the Fillmore West in San Francisco. According to their official biography, "The manager of a teenaged  musician Meyers was tutoring got the Bittersweets’ demo into the hands of taste-making San Francisco station KFOG" which helped broaden their success.  After their third public appearance they signed with Virt Records. After moving to Nashville the band signed with Compass Records.

Discography

Studio albums

The Life You Always Wanted 
 Released June 27, 2006, on the Virt Records label
 Additional musicians drums: Steve Bowman (Counting Crows, Third Eye Blind); bass: Daniel Schacht (Jolie Holland); piano and guitar: Jerry Becker
 All songs written by Meyers
 Produced by Meyers, Schacht and Becker
 Tracks
 When the World Ends
 Adam
 Bag of Bones
 Long Day
 Houston
 Mostly Happy People
 Burn out My Eyes
 Shooting out the Sky
 Rapture
 Prison
 And Death Shall Have No Dominion

Goodnight, San Francisco 
 Released September 9, 2008, on the Compass Records label
 Produced by Lex Price (Mindy Smith)
 Additional Musicians steel guitar: Russ Pahl (Don Williams); bass: Dave Jacques (John Prine); drums: Steve Bowman (Counting Crows); guitar: Doug Lancio (Patty Griffin); cello: David Henry (Ben Folds); organ: John Deaderick (Emmylou Harris)
 Mixed by Jason Lehning (Guster)
 Tracks
 Wreck 4:20 
 Blue 3:55
 Is Anyone Safe 4:48
 Birmingham 3:49
 45 3:59
 My Sweet Love 3:39
 Bordertown 4:19
 Tidal Waves 4:30
 Lies 4:30
 Goodnight, San Francisco 3:52
 When the War is Over 4:21
 Fortunate Wind 3:24

Extended play release

EP 
 Released January 1, 2005, on the Poor Valley Recording Co. label
 Tracks
 Long Day 4:06
 Mostly Happy People 3:39
 Shooting Out the Sky 4:39
 Bag of Bones 4:41
 Houston 5:12

Live albums

Long Way From Home 
 Released in 2009 on the Compass Records label
 Tracks
 Mostly Happy People 3:36
 Adam 4:30
 When the World Ends 3:53
 Houston
 Shooting Out the Sky 4:30
 Bring Me Little Water, Sylvie 2:24 (Lead Belly)
 Rapture 3:48
 Bag of Bones 5:07
 Unchained Melody 5:05 (Alex North and Hy Zaret)
 Long Day 3:52
 Prison 3:51

Live in Atlanta 2.4.09 
 Released February 10, 2009, on NoiseTrade.com
 Tracks
 Wreck 4:41
 Blue 4:17
 Fortunate Wind 2:34
 Prison 3:49
 Birmingham 4:07
 Goodnight, San Francisco 4:19
 Is Anyone Safe 4:09
 My Sweet Love 4:10
 Long Day 3:57

Other notes

 "Long Day" from The Life You Always Wanted appears on the KFOG Local Scene: Volume 3 compilation.
 The band has opened for Train, Rosanne Cash, and the Cowboy Junkies.
 The band's music has been used in prime-time series "Men In Trees" and "Saving Grace".
 The Life You Always Wanted was listed amongst the top 200 sellers in the San Francisco Bay Area during the first week of its release.

References

External links
 http://www.thebittersweets.com

American alternative country groups
Musical groups from San Francisco
Musical groups from Nashville, Tennessee
American folk musical groups
American pop music groups
Rock music groups from Tennessee